Ramal de Aveiro is a Portuguese metre gauge railway line operated by Comboios de Portugal. It connects Aveiro and Sernada, where it connects with Linha do Vouga.

Since 2002, services on the line have largely been operated by CP's Série 9630 diesel multiple units, which replaced the previous ex-Yugoslav Série 9700 diesel multiple units and the Dutch-built Série 9300 railcars.

See also 
 List of railway lines in Portugal
 List of Portuguese locomotives and railcars
 History of rail transport in Portugal
 Narrow gauge railways
 Infraestruturas de Portugal

References

The Portuguese Government's strategic transport plan 2011-2015, including the proposed closure of the Vouga line

Aveiro
Metre gauge railways in Portugal
Railway lines opened in 1908
1908 establishments in Portugal